The  was an overnight sleeper train service in Japan operated by JR West from Kyoto Station to Nagasaki Station and return. It ran on the Tōkaido, Sanyō, Kagoshima, and Nagasaki main lines.

From October 2005, the train ran coupled with the Naha sleeper between Kyoto Station and Tosu Station.

Due to falling passenger numbers, both the Naha and Akatsuki services ceased following the March 15, 2008, timetable revision.

Schedule
Timetable of Akatsuki, as of March 2008 before its discontinuation

Source: Ekikara Jikokuhyō

History
Akatsuki, as an overnight limited express service, was introduced on October 1, 1965, by Japanese National Railways. It was operated between Shin-Ōsaka and two destinations in Kyūshū, namely Nishi-Kagoshima (present-day Kagoshima-Chūō) and Nagasaki. It was connected at Shin-Ōsaka with the Tōkaidō Shinkansen.

In the 1960s, the operation of Akatsuki was increased. Its maximum operation was 14 services (7 round-trips) a day in the mid-1970s, and all of them were connected with the Tōkaidō Shinkansen.

At the end of the 1970s, the number of Akatsuki services was reduced due to decreasing ridership.

From November 1986, Akatsuki remains as only two services (one round-trips) a day.

Due to falling passenger numbers, the service was discontinued in March 2008.

Rolling stock

Historically, Akatsuki used the following types of coaches:
20 series passenger cars
14/15 series passenger cars
24/25 series passenger cars
When the train was discontinued, the train consisted of 14/15 series cars.

See also
 List of named passenger trains of Japan

Named passenger trains of Japan
West Japan Railway Company
Night trains of Japan
Railway services introduced in 1965
Railway services discontinued in 2008